This is a list of notable events in country music that took place in the year 1953.

Events 
 January 1 — Hank Williams, due to play a New Year's Day show in Canton, Ohio, dies sometime after midnight in the rear seat of his Cadillac, somewhere between Knoxville, Tennessee and Oak Hill, West Virginia. He was 29. Stories conflict on what happened in the final hours of his life, but what is not disputed is that his death gave rise to the legend. In the 60-plus years following his death, Williams' songs would be covered countless times, singers and songwriters would directly cite him as an influence, and his son – Hank Williams, Jr. - then 3, would become a star in his own right. The last song released in his lifetime was "I'll Never Get Out of This World Alive."

Top hits of the year

Number one hits

United States
(as certified by Billboard)

Notes
1^ No. 1 song of the year, as determined by Billboard.
2^ Song dropped from No. 1 and later returned to top spot.
A^ First Billboard No. 1 hit for that artist.
B^ Only Billboard No. 1 hit for that artist.

Note: Several songs were simultaneous No. 1 hits on the separate "Most Played in Juke Boxes," "Most Played by Jockeys" and "National Best Sellers" charts.

Other major hits

Top new album releases

Births 
 April 9 — Hal Ketchum, popular country artist of the early 1990s. (d. 2020)
 June 1 — Ronnie Dunn, one half of Brooks & Dunn.
 July 9 - David Ball - Singer-Songwriter prominent in the mid 1990's & early 2000's (Thinking Problem), (Riding With Private Malone)
 October 8 - Ricky Lee Phelps - Former lead singer of The Kentucky Headhunters (Dumas Walker), (Walk Softly On This Heart Of Mine)
 November 4 – Van Stephenson, singer-songwriter and member of the 1990s group BlackHawk (d. 2001)

Deaths 
 January 1 — Hank Williams, 29, country music singing-songwriting giant and pioneer.

Further reading 
 Kingsbury, Paul, "Vinyl Hayride: Country Music Album Covers 1947–1989," Country Music Foundation, 2003
 Millard, Bob, "Country Music: 70 Years of America's Favorite Music," HarperCollins, New York, 1993
 Whitburn, Joel. "Top Country Songs 1944–2005 – 6th Edition." 2005.

Country
Country music by year